The 2015 SAFF U-19 Championship was the 1st edition of the SAFF U-19 Championship, an international football competition for men's under-19 national teams organized by SAFF. The tournament was hosted by Nepal from 20–29 of August. Six teams from the region took part, dividing into two groups. Nepal defeated India in the penalty shot in the finals and won the championship making Nepal first country to win the first U-19 SAFF Championship.

On 3 August, both Pakistan and Sri Lanka withdrew from the competition.

Participating teams

 
 
 
  (Host)

Venue

Group stage
All matches were played in Lalitpur, Nepal.
Times listed are UTC+05:45.

Group A

Group B

Knockout stage

Semi-finals

Final

Winner

Goalscorers

References

2015
2015 in Asian football
2015
2015–16 in Nepalese football
2015–16 in Indian football
2015 in Bhutanese football
2015 in Bangladeshi football
2015 in Maldivian football
2015 in Afghan football
2015 in youth association football